Pisani may refer to:

Pisani (surname), Italian surname
Pisani family, a Venetian patrician family active in the Venetian Republic from the 12th to the 18th Centuries
Rocca Pisana
Palazzo Contarini Pisani
Palazzo Soranzo Pisani
Italian submarine Vettor Pisani, an Italian Pisani-class submarine serving the Regia Marina during World War II

See also
Pisano (disambiguation)
Villa Pisani (disambiguation)